Ada Willenberg (née Lubelczyk) (born January 11, 1929) is a Polish-Israeli Holocaust survivor. She is the widow of fellow Holocaust survivor, sculptor and writer Samuel Willenberg (1923-2016).

Ada Willenberg was born in Warsaw (Second Polish Republic) in January 1929. She lived in the Jewish quarter of this city, together with her parents, grandmother and uncle. Her parents had a leather goods company, where leather products were produced for (among others) German companies. Ten-year-old Ada moved to Czyżew in 1939, but shortly afterwards the family moved to a three-room apartment in the Warsaw Ghetto, where they lived with other Jewish families. On August 18, 1942, her mother was deported to Treblinka concentration camp, while Ada and her grandmother remained in the ghetto. In March 1943, a few months before the destruction of the ghetto, she decided to jump the walls of the ghetto and run for her life. Ada got false documents and worked on a farm in Oschatz until the end of the war.

In 1945, Ada went back to Poland, where she studied dentistry. In 1946, she met Samuel Willenberg, and the two married in 1948. In 1950, during the peak years of Stalinism in Poland, Willenberg emigrated to Israel with her husband and her mother-in-law. She has one daughter, Orit Willenberg-Giladi, and three grandchildren.

References

External links
 
 Interview with Ada Willenberg 

1929 births
Living people
People from Warsaw
Israeli people of Polish-Jewish descent
Polish emigrants to Israel
Warsaw Ghetto inmates